LexShares is an online marketplace for investing in litigation. It connects plaintiffs in commercial legal disputes with investors to fund their cases. Founded in 2014, LexShares is privately owned with an office presence in New York City.

The LexShares platform, launched by co-founders Jay Greenberg and Max Volsky, is an online marketplace for litigation funding, similar to equity crowdfunding. The LexShares platform connects accredited investors with plaintiffs and attorneys looking for funding. Investors can buy a stake in the outcome of a lawsuit by giving plaintiffs, oftentimes business owners, the capital they need to pay legal fees or operate their business while in the midst of litigation.

LexShares funds individual commercial cases. When a new case is offered, LexShares' investor network is notified and has the opportunity to invest through their online platform. In 2018, LexShares closed its debut $25 million multi-claim marketplace fund.

On 10 June 2020, LexShares confirmed the introduction of LexShares Marketplace Fund II (LMFII), a dedicated litigation finance fund with a target size of $100 million. LMFII will invest in litigation-related assets made available on the LexShares marketplace.

On 22 February 2021, LexShares announced majority investment from Brockhurst Capital Partners and that managing partner Cayse Llorens would join the firm as CEO.

References

External links
 LexShares

2014 establishments in the United States
Financial services companies of the United States
Online marketplaces of the United States